Ministries Without Borders (MWB) is an Evangelical neocharismatic Apostolic network of  nearly 50 Christian churches, that forms part of the British New Church Movement.  It is led by  Keri Jones, brother of the late Bryn Jones.

History
Keri Jones originally worked with his brother in Covenant Ministries,  which after Bryn's death devolved into five major components, of which MWB is one. According to the analysis of Andrew Walker, a commentator on neo-Pentecostalism in Britain, the two brothers led the more conservative and radical group of the restorationist movement of the 1970s and 1980s, which Walker called R1. This was to distinguish it from another similar group based in the South (led by, for example Gerald Coates) which had taken a different stance on a number of key issues.  MWB draws much from the legacy of Covenant Ministries, and the leadership of Arthur Wallis.

Today
The official description of MWB is: Ministries Without Borders ... speaks of a people who are inwardly free and outwardly mobile to use their gifts, talents and abilities, to take the message of Hope, the Gospel of Good News, to a needy and dying world. Such people, from every age group, are aware that every mandate given by God can be achieved, and that there are no problems too difficult for His power of miracle.

In 2007 MWB planted churches in the UK cities of Salford, Preston and Oldham;  there are 18 other churches in the UK, mainly in North West England, the Midlands and Wales. There are also three churches in the US and three in Canada; fifteen in Norway; five in South Africa, and two each in the Philippines and India.

In July 2006, Keri Jones launched "Mission 193," in which members of the movement visited every nation of the world to pray and give copies of the Bible to representatives of that country.

There is an annual Bible conference for its UK-based churches which has been in Stafford since 2004. They are similar in style to the Downs Bible Weeks run in the 1980s and feature ministry from international speakers.

See also
British New Church Movement
Charismatic movement
Spiritual gift

References

External links
 Without Borders website
 The mission 193 official website
 The charismatic/pentecostal movement in Norway: The last 30 years
 All Nations Ottawa

Apostolic networks
British New Church Movement
Charismatic denominations